Livingston County is a county located in the U.S. state of Illinois. According to the 2020 census, it has a population of 35,815. Its county seat is Pontiac. Livingston County comprises the Pontiac, IL Micropolitan Statistical Area, which is combined with the Bloomington–Normal metropolitan statistical area as the Bloomington-Pontiac, IL Combined Statistical Area.

History 
Livingston was established on February 27, 1837. It was formed from parts of McLean, LaSalle, and Iroquois counties, and named after Edward Livingston, a prominent politician who was mayor of New York City and represented New York in the United States House of Representatives and Louisiana in both houses of Congress. He later served as Andrew Jackson's Secretary of State and as Minister to France. Although he had no connections to Illinois, the General Assembly found him accomplished enough to name a county after him.

Geography
It is the fourth-largest county in Illinois by land area.

Climate and weather

Major highways
  Interstate 55
  U.S. Highway 24
  U.S. Highway 66
  Illinois Route 17
  Illinois Route 18
  Illinois Route 23
  Illinois Route 47
  Illinois Route 116
  Illinois Route 170

Adjacent counties
 LaSalle County - northwest
 Grundy County - north
 Kankakee County - northeast
 Ford County - southeast
 McLean County - southwest
 Woodford County - west

Demographics

As of the 2010 United States Census, there were 38,950 people, 14,613 households, and 9,741 families residing in the county. The racial makeup of the county was 91.8% white, 4.9% black or African American, 0.5% Asian, 0.2% American Indian, 1.3% from other races, and 1.3% from two or more races. Those of Hispanic or Latino origin made up 3.9% of the population. In terms of ancestry, 36.6% were German, 17.2% were Irish, 11.2% were American, 10.7% were English, and 5.1% were Italian.

Of the 14,613 households, 30.7% had children under the age of 18 living with them, 52.0% were married couples living together, 9.9% had a female householder with no husband present, 33.3% were non-families, and 28.6% of all households were made up of individuals. The average household size was 2.43 and the average family size was 2.98. The median age was 40.8 years.

The median income for a household in the county was $50,500 and the median income for a family was $60,933. Males had a median income of $44,639 versus $32,234 for females. The per capita income for the county was $23,259. About 9.1% of families and 11.0% of the population were below the poverty line, including 15.4% of those under age 18 and 6.9% of those age 65 or over.

Communities

Cities
 Fairbury
 Pontiac
 Streator

Town
 Chatsworth

Villages

 Campus
 Cornell
 Cullom
 Dwight
 Emington
 Flanagan
 Forrest
 Long Point
 Odell
 Reddick
 Saunemin
 Strawn

Townships
Livingston County is divided into thirty townships:

 Amity
 Avoca
 Belle Prairie
 Broughton
 Charlotte
 Chatsworth
 Dwight
 Eppards Point
 Esmen
 Fayette
 Forrest
 Germanville
 Indian Grove
 Long Point
 Nebraska
 Nevada
 Newtown
 Odell
 Owego
 Pike
 Pleasant Ridge
 Pontiac
 Reading
 Rooks Creek
 Round Grove
 Saunemin
 Sullivan
 Sunbury
 Union
 Waldo

Unincorporated communities

 Ancona
 Blackstone
 Blair
 Budd
 Cayuga
 Charlotte
 Graymont
 Manville
 Munster
 Nevada

Government and infrastructure
The Illinois Department of Corrections operates two prisons in the county.

Pontiac Correctional Center is located in Pontiac. Pontiac houses the male death row. Prior to the January 11, 2003 commutation of death row sentences, male death row inmates were housed in Pontiac, Menard, and Tamms correctional centers. Dwight Correctional Center is within Nevada Township in an unincorporated area in the county.

The Dwight Correctional Center is currently unoccupied and was closed in 2013.

Politics
Although it was solidly Democratic before 1856, Livingston has since always been a powerfully Republican county. The solitary Democrat to win a majority of the county's vote since the Civil War has been Franklin D. Roosevelt in his 1932 landslide triumph over Herbert Hoover. Apart from that and the 1912 election when Woodrow Wilson won against a mortally divided Republican Party, Livingston has always voted Republican since that party was founded in 1856. Since 1940, only Lyndon Johnson in his 1964 landslide victory over the conservative Barry Goldwater has won more than forty percent of the county's vote.

Notable residents
 Donald Attig, businessman and adventurer.
 Calistus Bruer, Illinois state representative and farmer
 M. C. Eignus, Illinois state representative
 Moira Harris, actress and wife of Gary Sinise.
 William Harris, first President of the Illinois Senate.
 Irene Hunt, Newbery Medal-winning author.
 Francis Townsend, physician and political activist whose advocacy for an old age revolving pension influenced the creation of the U.S. Social Security program.
 Skottie Young, comic book artist known for the Oz series. He was born and raised in Fairbury.

See also

 National Register of Historic Places listings in Livingston County, Illinois

References

Further reading
 The History of Livingston County, Illinois: Containing a History of the County — Its Cities, Counties, Etc.; A Directory of Its Taxpayers; War Record of Its Volunteers in the Late Rebellion; Portraits of Early Settlers and Prominent Men; General and Local Statistics; Map of Livingston County; History of Illinois, Illustrated; History of the Northwest, Illustrated; Constitution of the United States; Miscellaneous Matters; Etc., Etc. Chicago: William LeBaron Jr. and Co., 1878.

 
Illinois counties
1837 establishments in Illinois
Populated places established in 1837